Cedar Falls is a city in Black Hawk County, Iowa, United States. As of the 2020 census, the city population was 40,713. Cedar Falls is home to the University of Northern Iowa, a public university.

History
Cedar Falls was first settled in March 1845 by brothers-in-law William Sturgis and Erasmus D. Adams. Initially, the city was named Sturgis Falls. The city was called Sturgis Falls until it was merged with Cedar City (another city on the other side of the Cedar River), creating Cedar Falls. The city's founders are honored each year with a week long community-wide celebration named in their honor – the Sturgis Falls Celebration.

Because of the availability of water power, Cedar Falls developed as a milling and industrial center prior to the Civil War. The establishment of the Civil War Soldiers' Orphans Home in Cedar Falls changed the direction in which the city developed when, following the war, it became the first building on the campus of the Iowa State Normal School (now the University of Northern Iowa).

Geography
Cedar Falls is located at  (42.523520, −92.446402).

Natural forest, prairie and wetland areas are found within the city limits at the Hartman Reserve Nature Center.

Demographics

Cedar Falls is part of the Waterloo-Cedar Falls metropolitan area.

2020 census 
As of the census of 2020, there were 40,713 people, and 15,254 households. The racial makeup of the city was 91.2% White, 1.3% African American, 0.3% Native American, 4.5% Asian, and 2.5% from two or more races. Hispanic or Latino of any race were 2.7% of the population.

2010 census
As of the census of 2010, there were 39,260 people, 14,608 households, and 8,091 families living in the city. The racial makeup of the city was 93.4% White, 2.1% African American, 0.2% Native American, 2.3% Asian, 0.5% from other races, and 1.7% from two or more races. Hispanic or Latino of any race were 2.0% of the population.

There were 14,608 households, of which 24.8% had children under the age of 18 living with them, 45.5% were married couples living together, 7.2% had a female householder with no husband present, 2.7% had a male householder with no wife present, and 44.6% were non-families. 28.0% of all households were made up of individuals, and 10.4% had someone living alone who was 65 years of age or older. The average household size was 2.37 and the average family size was 2.88.

The median age in the city was 26.8 years. 17.3% of residents were under the age of 18; 29.7% were between the ages of 18 and 24; 20.5% were from 25 to 44; 20.1% were from 45 to 64; and 12.4% were 65 years of age or older. The gender makeup of the city was 48.1% male and 51.9% female.

2000 census
As of the census of 2000, there were 36,145 people, 12,833 households, and 7,558 families living in the city. The racial makeup of the city was 95.14% White, 1.57% Black or African American, 0.15% Native American, 1.61% Asian, 0.02% Pacific Islander, 0.41% from other races, and 1.09% from two or more races. 1.08% of the population were Hispanic or Latino of any race.

There were 12,833 households, out of which 26.9% had children under the age of 18 living with them, 48.9% were married couples living together, 7.5% had a female householder with no husband present, and 41.1% were non-families. 25.5% of all households were made up of individuals, and 9.4% had someone living alone who was 65 years of age or older. The average household size was 2.45 and the average family size was 2.91.

Age spread: 18.0% under the age of 18, 30.6% from 18 to 24, 20.5% from 25 to 44, 19.0% from 45 to 64, and 11.9% who were 65 years of age or older. The median age was 26 years. For every 100 females, there were 88.5 males. For every 100 females age 18 and over, there were 85.7 males.

The median income for a household in the city was $70,226, and the median income for a family was $85,158. Males had a median income of $60,235 versus $50,312 for females. The per capita income for the city was $27,140. About 5.6% of families and 4.7% of the population were below the poverty line, including 8.5% of those under age 18, and 6.1% of those age 65 or over.

Arts and culture
In 1986, the City of Cedar Falls established the Cedar Falls Art and Culture Board, which oversees the operation of the city's Cultural Division and the James & Meryl Hearst Center for the Arts.

Library 
The Cedar Falls Public Library is housed in the Adele Whitenach Davis building located at 524 Main Street. The 47,000 square foot (4,400 m2) structure, designed by Struxture Architects, replaced the Carniege-Dayton building in early 2004. As of the 2016 fiscal year, the library's holdings included approximately 8,000 audio materials, 12,000 video materials, and 104,000 books and periodicals for a grand total of approximately 124,000 items.   Patrons made 245,000 visits which took advantage of circulation services, adult, teen, and youth programming. Circulation of library materials for fiscal year 2016 was 543,134. The library also provides public access to more than 30 public computers which provide internet access, office software suites, high resolution color printing, wi-fi, and various games. The library also offers digital loaning through Libby, Hoopla, and other platforms.

The mission of the Cedar Falls Public Library is to promote literacy and provide open access to resources which facilitate lifelong learning. The library is a member of the Cedar Valley Library Consortium. Cedar Falls Public Library shares an Integrated Library System (SirsiDynix Symphony) with the Waterloo Public Library. Library management is provided by Kelly Stern, Director of the Cedar Falls Public Library.

Historical Society
The Cedar Falls Historical Society has its offices in the Victorian Home and Carriage House Museum. It preserves Cedar Falls' history through its five museums, collection, archives, and public programs.   Besides the Victorian House, the Society operates the Cedar Falls Ice House, Little Red Schoolhouse, and Behrens-Rapp Station.

Retail
The city's major shopping mall is College Square Mall, built in 1969.

Theatre 
The Oster Regent Theatre in downtown Cedar Falls originally opened in 1910 as the Cotton Theatre. It is currently the home of the Cedar Falls Community Theatre which was founded in 1978. The company produces approximately seven to eight shows per season.

The Gallagher-Bluedorn Performing Arts Center on the University of Northern Iowa campus hosts many professionally touring Broadway plays and musicals throughout the year. The facility's Great Hall can seat 1,680 patrons.

Education 

It hosts one of three public universities in Iowa, University of Northern Iowa (UNI).

Cedar Falls Community Schools, which covers most of the city limits, includes Cedar Falls High School, two junior high schools, seven elementary schools. Waterloo Community School District covers a small section of Cedar Falls. There is a private Christian school, Valley Lutheran High School. Additionally there is a private Catholic elementary school at St. Patrick Catholic Church, under the Roman Catholic Archdiocese of Dubuque. A significant renovation occurred beginning in May 2014.

The Malcolm Price Lab School/Northern University High School, was a state-funded K–12 school run by the university. It closed in 2012 following cuts at UNI.

Utilities and internet access
The city owns its power, gas and water, and cable TV service. Because of this, Cedar Falls Utilities provides gigabit speeds to residents, this became available on January 14, 2015. Cedar Falls has the power to do so because, unlike 19 other states, Iowa does not prohibit municipal broadband from competing with the private cable TV monopoly. In 2020, Cedar Falls Utilities was recognized by PC Magazine as having the nation's fastest internet, by a factor of three.

Transportation
Cedar Falls has public transportation provided by the Metropolitan Transit Authority of Black Hawk County.

Media
FM radio
 88.1 KBBG
 88.9 KWVI
 89.5 KHKE
 90.9 KUNI (FM)
 92.3 KOEL-FM – Licensed to Oelwein with main studios in Waterloo
 93.5 KCVM
 94.5 KULT-LP
 97.7 KCRR – Licensed to Grundy Center with main studios in Waterloo
 98.5 KKHQ-FM
 99.3 KWAY-FM – Located in Waverly
 101.9 KNWS-FM
 105.1 KCFI
 105.7 KOKZ
 107.9 KFMW

AM radio
 600 WMT – Located in Cedar Rapids
 640 WOI – Located in Ames
 950 KOEL – Located in Oelwein
 1040 WHO – Located in Des Moines
 1090 KNWS
 1250 KCFI
 1330 KPTY
 1540 KXEL
 1650 KCNZ

Broadcast television
2 KGAN 2 (CBS) – Located in Cedar Rapids
7 KWWL 7 (NBC, The CW on DT2, Me-TV on DT3) - Located in Waterloo
9 KCRG 9 (ABC) – Located in Cedar Rapids
12 KIIN 12 (PBS/IPTV) – Located in Iowa City
17 K17ET 17 / K31PO-D 44 (TBN)
20 KWKB 20 (Court TV Mystery) – Located in Iowa City
28 KFXA 28 (Fox) – Located in Cedar Rapids
32 KRIN 32 (PBS/IPTV)
40 KFXB-TV 40 (CTN) – Located in Dubuque

Print
 The Courier, daily newspaper
 The Cedar Falls Times, weekly newspaper
 The Cedar Valley What Not, weekly advertiser

Music
The underground music scene in the Cedar Falls area from 1977 to present-day is well documented. The Wartburg College Art Gallery in Waverly, Iowa hosted a collaborative history of the bands, record labels, and music venues involved in the Cedar Falls music scene which ran from March 17 to April 14, 2007. This effort has been continued as a wiki-style website called The Secret History of the Cedar Valley.

Notable people 

Actors
 Annabeth Gish – actress
 Gary Kroeger – actor, Saturday Night Live 1982–1985
 Michael Mosley – actor, Scrubs
 Mark Steines – co-host, Entertainment Tonight, alumnus of University of Northern Iowa
 Joe Trotter — actor/comedian, Andersonville

Athletes
 Trev Alberts – football player, 1993 Butkus Award (for best linebacker in NCAA Division I), All-American at Nebraska; a No. 1 draft choice of Indianapolis Colts, broadcaster, former Director of Athletics at University of Nebraska-Omaha 2009–2021, Vice Chancellor, and Director of Athletics at the University of Nebraska-Lincoln, 2021–present.
 Don Denkinger – Major League Baseball umpire, made controversial call in 1985 World Series
 Travis Fulton – UFC fighter
 A. J. Green – NBA player
 David Johnson – running back for NFL's Arizona Cardinals, UNI alumnus
 Bryce Paup – NFL player, UNI alumnus
 Chad Rinehart – NFL player, Boone High School, UNI
 Nick Ring – UFC fighter
 Edgar Seymour – Olympic bobsledder
 Terry Stotts – NBA player and coach
 Dedric Ward – NFL wide receiver, UNI alumnus
 Kurt Warner – NFL quarterback for St. Louis Rams, New York Giants and Arizona Cardinals, Super Bowl champion, UNI alumnus
 Ross Pierschbacher – NFL player
 Isaac Boettger – NFL player

Military
 Robert Hibbs – Medal of Honor recipient

Musicians

 Karen Holvik – classical soprano, currently on the faculty of the Eastman School of Music
 Nilo Hovey – acclaimed instrumental music pedagogue, author of numerous instrument method books
 House of Large Sizes – an alternative rock band
 Bonnie Koloc – folk singer, songwriter and musician, born in Waterloo, Iowa, attended UNI

 Spirit of the Stairway – Mathcore band
 Bill Stewart – jazz drummer and composer, attended UNI
 Tracie Spencer – singer

Politicians
 Marv Diemer – Iowa state legislator
 Charles Grassley – U.S. Senator, attended UNI
 Gil Gutknecht – former Minnesota congressman
 Roger Jepsen – former U.S. Senator

Scientists
 Gerald Guralnik – physicist, co-discoverer of the "Higgs Mechanism"

Writers
 Bess Streeter Aldrich (1881–1954) – novelist
 R.V. Cassill – novelist and short story writer
 James Hearst – poet, farmer, professor of creative writing at UNI between 1941 and 1975
 Helen Markley Miller (1896 – 1984), writer of historical and biographical fiction for children about the Western United States.
 Ruth Suckow Nuhn (1892–1960) – author of short stories and novels (including Country People, The Folks, New Hope)
 Ferner Nuhn (1903–1989) – literary critic, author of articles and essays, artist, Quaker activist
 Nancy Price – author of Sleeping with the Enemy
 Leland Sage – professor at UNI and historian
 Robert James Waller – author of The Bridges of Madison County, attended UNI

Other
 Marc Andreessen – co-founder, Netscape Corporation
 Raja Chari – astronaut 
 Adelia M. Hoyt (1865–1966) – Braille librarian, Library of Congress
 John H. Livingston – aviator and air racer
 Randy & Vicki Weaver – parents, John Deere Employee, Ruby Ridge incident
Tim Dodd – popular STEM communicator and YouTube Creator known as the "Everyday Astronaut"

See also 

 Black Hawk Hotel
 Cedar Falls Ice House
 Cedar Falls Utilities
 University of Northern Iowa Teaching and Research Greenhouse

References

Further reading
 Brian C. Collins. Images of America: Cedar Falls, Iowa. Arcadia Publishing, Inc. 1998.

External links 

 City of Cedar Falls
 Cedar Falls Chamber of Commerce
 Cedar Falls Tourism and Visitors Bureau
 Cedar Falls Historical Society

 
Cities in Iowa
Cities in Black Hawk County, Iowa
Waterloo – Cedar Falls metropolitan area
1845 establishments in Iowa Territory
Populated places established in 1845